This is a list of short story Iranian writers  either born in Iran or holding Iranian citizenship, also Non-Iranian Persian short story writers and short story writers of Iranian descent.

A 

 Bozorg Alavi
 Ghazaleh Alizadeh
 Ahmad Akbarpur
 Mehdi Akhavan-Sales : Persian poet, also wrote some stories
 Jalal Al-e-Ahmad
 Ali Ashraf Darvishian
 Yosuf Ali-Khani
 Mahshid Amir-Shahi
 Salar Abdoh
 Habib Ahmad-Zadeh
 Reza Allameh-Zadeh
 Noushin Ahmadi Khorasani :  journalist, women's rights activist, also wrote short stories
 Ali Mohammad Afghani
 Reza Amirkhani

B 

 Reza Baraheni
 Samad Behrangi

C 

 Sadeq Chubak

D 

 Simin Daneshvar
 Mahmoud Dowlat Abadi

E 
 Mahmoud Etemadzadeh

F 
 Bahman Forsi
 Pooran Farrokhzad

G 

 Ibrahim Golistan
 Houshang Golshiri
 Houshang Gol-Makani

H 

 Sadeq Hedayat
 Mohammad Hijazi

I 

 Nader Ibrahimi

J 

 Mohammad ali Jamal-Zadeh
 Sepideh Jodeyri, poet, translator and journalist also published a short story collection
 Parviz Jahani

K 

 Nasim Khaksar
 Kamshad Kooshan :  is an Iranian-American Movie Writer and Director, also wrote short story.
 Hakob Karapents

M 

 Bahman Motamedian
 Mostafa Mastoor
 Ahmad Mahmoud
 Abbas Maroufi
 Shokooh Mirzadegi
 Jaafar Modarres-Sadeghi
 Fereshteh Molavi
 Houshang Moradi Kermani
 Jamal Mir-Sadeghi
 Aziz Mo'tazedi
 Mahshid Moshiri
 Javad Mujabi
 Shahriar Mandanipour

N 

 Bijan Najdi
 Ata Nahaei
 Saeed Nafisi

P 

 Shahrnush Parsipur
 Iraj Pezashk-Zad
 Zoya Pirzad
 Parween Pazhwak

R 
 Muniro Ravanipur
 Fozia Rahgozar
 Atiq Rahimi

S 

 Hossein Sanapour
 Mahasti Shahrokhi
 Gholam-Hossein Sa'edi
 Asef Soltanzadeh
 Ahmad Shamloo : Persian poet, also wrote short stories
 Sana Safi
 Sepideh Shamlou
 Marzieh Sotoudeh

T 

 Mohammad Tolouei
 Shabnam Tolouei
 Goli Taraghi

V 
 Fariba Vafi

Y 

 Mehri Yalfani

Z 
Gol-Mohammad Zhowandai

See also
Persian literature
List of Iranian writers
List of Persian-language poets and authors

Short story writers
Iranian

Persian-language writers